Grand Gedeh is a county in the eastern portion of the West African nation of Liberia. One of 15 counties that constitute the first-level of administrative division in the nation, it has three districts. Zwedru (formerly Tchien) serves as the capital with the area of the county. Measuring , it is larger than 28 independent countries including Lebanon, Trinidad and Tobago, Cape Verde, Malta and Mauritius and the combined area of the US states of Delaware and Rhode Island. As of the 2008 Census, it had a population of 126,146, making it the ninth most populous county in Liberia. Grand Gedeh has lower tropical forests which has mid size hills composed of various valleys and water courses.

Grand Gedeh's County Superintendent is Kai Farley. The county is bordered by Nimba County to the west, Sinoe County to the southwest, and River Gee County to the southeast. The northern part of Grand Gedeh borders the nation of Côte d'Ivoire.

Geography
Grand Chedah has lower tropical forests which has mid size hills composed of various valleys and water courses. It has evergreen forests. While in the uplands it is conducive for rice cultivation, the low lying areas are conducive for yam, cocoa, plantains, potatoes, vegetables, rubber, coffee and sugarcane. There are three National plantation areas: the SIGA Reforestation project, EAC Reforestation project and the WATRACE Reforestation project. It also shares the National proposed reserve of Grebo Forest with River Gee County.

Demographics

In the 1984 Census, the county had a population of 63,028 people. The county is home to large Muslim and Ivorian populations. As of 2008, the county had a population of 125,258: 64,994 male and 60,264 female. The sex ratio was 107.8 compared to 96.3 in 1994 census. The number of households during 2008 was 8,969 and the average size of the households was 6.8. The population was 3.00 per cent of the total population, while it was 3.60 per cent in 1994. The county had an area of 4,191 sq mi and the density per sq.mi was 30. The density during the 1984 census stood at 15. Liberia experienced civil war during various times and the total number of people displaced on account of wars as of 2008 in the county was 81,624. The number of people residing in urban areas was 41,673, with 20,696 males and 20,977 females. The total number of people in rural areas was 83,585, with 44,298 males and 39,287 females. The total fraction of people residing in urban areas was 33.27 per cent, while the remaining 067 per cent were living in rural areas. The number of people resettled as of 2008 was 4,508 while the number of people who were not resettled was 263. The number of literates above the age of ten as of 2008 was 19,297 while the number of illiterates was 19,758 making the literacy rate to 49.41. The total number of literate males was 12,513 while the total number of literate females was 6,784.

Economy
The total production stood at 8300 metric tonnes. As of 2011, the number of Cassava plantation was 4200, which was 3.4 per cent of the total area of Cassava planted in the country. The total production stood at 1140 metric tonnes. The number of Cocoa plantation was 1140, which was 2.9 per cent of the total area of Cassava planted in the country. The number of rubber plantation was 230, which was 0.4 per cent of the total area of Cassava planted in the country. The number of Coffee plantation was 240, which was 1.1 per cent of the total area of Cassava planted in the country. As of 2008, the county had 2,686 paid employees, 13,695 self-employed people, 15,578 family workers, 4,868 people looking for work, 7,159 not working people, 13,840 people working in households, 36,350 students, 236 retired people, 1,621 incapacitated people, 1,929 part-time workers  and 8,951 others, making the total working population of 106,913.

Administration
The Legislature of Liberia was modeled based on the Legislature of United States. It is bicameral in nature with a Senate and the House of Representatives. There are 15 counties in the country and based on the population, each county is defined to have at least two members, while the total number of members to the house including the Speaker being 73. Each member represents an electoral district and elected to a six year term based on popular vote. There were 30 senators, two each for the 15 counties and they serve a nine year term (30 senators, 15 counties and nine years from 2011). Senators are also elected based on plurality of votes. The Vice-President is the head of the Senate and he also acts as President in his absence.
Districts of Grand Gedeh County include (2008 population): Gbarzon District (74,255), Konobo District (21,424) and Tchien District (30,467) are the districts in the county.

See also
Gwin Town
Tuzon

Notes

References

External links
Grand Gedeh Association (Minnesota Chapter)
County Development Agenda
Place name codes

 
Counties of Liberia
1964 establishments in Liberia
 States and territories established in 1964